Lower Nine Mile River is a community in the Canadian province of Nova Scotia, located in the Municipal District of East Hants .

References
Lower Nine Mile River on Destination Nova Scotia

Communities in Hants County, Nova Scotia
General Service Areas in Nova Scotia